SGAP may refer to:
Aminopeptidase S, an enzyme
Australian Native Plants Society, an Australian federation of organizations dedicated to conservation and cultivation of native plants